The Sâne Morte (the dead Sâne) is a  long river in the Ain and Saône-et-Loire départements, eastern France. Its source is at Foissiat. It flows generally north-northwest. It is a right tributary of the Sâne Vive into which it flows at Ménetreuil.

Départements and communes along its course
This list is ordered from source to mouth: 
 Ain: Foissiat, Lescheroux, Cormoz, Saint-Nizier-le-Bouchoux, 
 Saône-et-Loire: Varennes-Saint-Sauveur, 
 Ain: Curciat-Dongalon, 
 Saône-et-Loire: Montpont-en-Bresse, Sainte-Croix, La Chapelle-Naude, Sornay, Bantanges, Ménetreuil,

References

Rivers of France
Rivers of Ain
Rivers of Saône-et-Loire
Rivers of Bourgogne-Franche-Comté
Rivers of Auvergne-Rhône-Alpes